The Church of Our Lady of Sorrows and Saint Isidore the Laborer is a Roman Catholic parish church in Libertad, San José Department, Uruguay.

This parish was established in 1922. It is held by the Missionary Oblates of Mary Immaculate. The temple is dedicated to Our Lady of Sorrows and saint Isidore the Laborer.

References

1922 establishments in Uruguay
Roman Catholic churches completed in 1922
Roman Catholic church buildings in San José Department
20th-century Roman Catholic church buildings in Uruguay
Our Lady of Sorrows